Hammond Park is a southern suburb of Perth, Western Australia, located within the City of Cockburn. Hammond Park was previously part of Banjup, and the suburb was created in March 2002. It was named after James Hammond, a pioneer of the Jandakot district who settled there in 1887.

Education
The three primary schools in Hammond Park are Wattleup East Primary School (planning name) will be built in 2024.  Hammond Park Primary School (established 2014) and Hammond Park Catholic Primary School (established 2013). The only secondary school in Hammond Park is Hammond Park Secondary College (established 2020). Hammond Park Secondary College had 175 Year 7 students in 2020 and it is expected to have a full year 7-12 campus by 2025.

Sport 
Hammond Park is home to the Hammond Park Junior Football Club, who currently play at Botany Park.

In early 2021 construction began for the Frankland Park Sports and Community Facility. The multipurpose facility will be built on Frankland Avenue and will include amenities to cater for the Hammond Park Junior Football Club and Melville Braves Baseball Club. The facility will comprise club and function spaces, food and beverage areas, toilets, change rooms, and ablutions (toilets/showers). External sporting facilities will include two fenced, bore-reticulated grass ovals with lighting for AFL use, a baseball batting cage, exercise equipment and a spectator viewing area. A carpark for 151 cars will have shade trees and lighting. Construction of the facility is expected to be completed in early 2022.

References

External links

Suburbs of Perth, Western Australia
Suburbs in the City of Cockburn